Shane Bauer is an American journalist, best known for his undercover reporting for Mother Jones magazine. He has won several awards including the Harvard's Goldsmith Prize for Investigative Reporting and the National Magazine Award for Best Reporting.

Life 
Bauer grew up in Onamia, Minnesota and he is a graduate of the University of California, Berkeley.

In July 2009, Bauer and two companions (Joshua Fattal and Sarah Shourd) were arrested by Iranian border guards after straying into Iran while allegedly hiking in northern Iraq near the Iranian border. The three Americans were held in prison in Iran on espionage charges for more than two years before their release in September 2011. 
They subsequently co-authored a memoir of their experience (A Sliver of Light), as well as the cover story ("Kidnapped by Iran") for the March–April 2014 issue of Mother Jones magazine.

Bauer has worked as a foreign correspondent, reporting from Iraq, Sudan, Chad, Syria, Lebanon, and Yemen. 
His work has appeared in The Nation, Salon.com, the Los Angeles Times, the Christian Science Monitor, and The New Yorker.

In 2015 he worked as an undercover journalist for Mother Jones while employed for six months as a prison guard at the Winn Correctional Center, a private prison in Winn Parish, Louisiana managed by the Corrections Corporation of America (now known as CoreCivic).

In 2016, he took on another undercover news assignment for Mother Jones, infiltrating Three Percent United Patriots, a right-wing border militia in southern Arizona.

Works

Books

Awards

Fellowships

See also
 List of foreign nationals detained in Iran

References

External links 

21st-century American journalists
American investigative journalists
American male journalists
University of California, Berkeley alumni
Living people
CoreCivic people
American prison officers
Inmates of Evin Prison
Year of birth missing (living people)